Live in West Hollywood is a live album recorded at the Troubadour by pop punk band The Queers.

Track listing
 "We'd Have a Riot Doing Heroin" - 1:56
 "This Place Sucks" - 0:40
 "Tulu Is a Wimp" - 0:58
 "I Want Cunt" - 0:21
 "Monster Zero" - 2:00
 "You're Tripping" - 1:37
 "I Live This Life" - 1:43
 "Tamara's a Punk" - 1:40
 "Mirage" (Tommy James and the Shondells cover) - 2:45
 "No Tit" - 1:26
 "Blabbermouth" - 1:03
 "I Can't Stand You" - 1:13
 "Hi Mom, It's Me" - 0:45
 "Granola Head" - 1:56
 "Noodlebrain" - 2:44
 "My Old Man's a Fatso" (Angry Samoans cover) - 1:17
 "Fuck You" - 0:54
 "I'm Not a Mongo Anymore" - 1:18
 "I Will Be With You" (Mr. T Experience cover) - 1:45
 "Kill That Girl" (The Ramones cover) - 2:10
 "Kicked Out of the Weboloes" - 0:57
 "I Hate Everything" - 1:14
 "Teenage Bonehead" - 2:06
 "Love Love Love" - 2:30
 "Another Girl" - 1:40
 "I Only Drink Bud" - 1:55
 "Punk Rock Girls" - 2:52
 "Ursula Finally Has Tits" - 2:25
 "I Like Young Girls" - 1:39
 "Nothing to Do" - 1:07
 "Fuck the World" - 3:37

The Queers albums
2001 live albums
Hopeless Records live albums
Albums recorded at the Troubadour